Presenilin-1 (PS-1) is a presenilin protein that in humans is encoded by the PSEN1 gene. Presenilin-1 is one of the four core proteins in the gamma secretase complex, which is considered to play an important role in generation of amyloid beta (Aβ) from amyloid-beta precursor protein (APP). Accumulation of amyloid beta is associated with the onset of Alzheimer's disease.

Structure 

Presenilin possesses a 9 transmembrane domain topology, with an extracellular C-terminus and a cytosolic N-terminus. Presenilin undergoes endo-proteolytic processing to produce ~27-28 kDa N-terminal and ~16-17 kDa C-terminal fragments in humans. Furthermore, presenilin exists in the cell mainly as a heterodimer of the C-terminal and N-terminus fragments. When presenilin 1 is overexpressed, the full length protein accumulates in an inactive form. Based on evidence that a gamma-secretase inhibitor binds to the fragments, the cleaved presenilin complex is considered to be the active form.

Function 

Presenilins are postulated to regulate APP processing through their effects on gamma secretase, an enzyme that cleaves APP. Also, it is thought that the presenilins are involved in the cleavage of the Notch receptor, such that they either directly regulate gamma secretase activity or themselves are protease enzymes. Multiple alternatively spliced transcript variants have been identified for this gene, the full-length natures of only some have been determined.

Notch signaling pathway 

In Notch signaling, critical proteolytic reactions takes place during maturation and activation of Notch membrane receptor. Notch1 is cleaved extracellularlly at site1 (S1) and two polypeptides are produced to form a heterodimer receptor on the cell surface. After the formation of receptor, Notch1 is further cleaved in site 3(S3) and release Notch1 intracellular domain (NICD) from the membrane.

Presenilin 1 has been shown to play an important role in proteolytic process. In the prenilin 1 null mutant drosophila, Notch signaling is abolished and it displays a notch-like lethal phenotype. Moreover, in mammalian cells, deficiency of PSEN1 also causes the defect in the proteolytic release of NICD from a truncated Notch construct. The same step can be also blocked by several gamma-secretase inhibitors, shown in the same study. These evidences collectively suggest a critical role of presenilin 1 in the Notch signaling pathway.

Wnt signaling pathway 

Wnt signaling pathway has been shown to be involved in several critical steps in embryogenesis and development. Presenilin 1 has been shown to form a complex with beta-catenin, an important component in Wnt signaling, and stabilize beta-catenin. Mutant of presenilin-1 that reduces the ability to stabilize beta-catenin complex leads to hyperactive degradation of beta-catenin in the brains of transgenic mice.

Considered as a negative regulator in wnt signaling pathway, presenilin-1 was also found to play a role in beta-catenin phosphorylation. Beta-catenin is coupled by presenilin-1 and undergoes a sequential phosphorylation by two kinase activities. The study also further illustrates that the deficiency of presenilin 1 disconnects the sequential phosphorylation and thus disrupts the normal wnt signaling pathway.

Clinical significance

Beta-amyloid production 
Transgenic mice that over-expressed mutant presenilin-1 show an increase of beta-amyloid-42(43) in the brain, which suggest presenilin-1 plays an important role in beta-amyloid regulation and can be highly related to Alzheimer's disease. Further study conducted in neuronal cultures derived from presenilin-1 deficient mouse embryos showed that cleavage by alpha- and beta- secretase was still normal without the presence of presenilin-1. Meanwhile, when the cleavage by gamma-cleavage of the transmembrane domain of APP was abolished a 5-fold drop of amyloid peptide was observed, suggesting that deficiency of presenilin-1 can downregulate amyloid and inhibition of presenilin-1 can be a potential method for anti-amyloidogenic therapy in Alzheimer's disease. Extensive study on the role of presenilin-1 in amyloid production has been conducted to improve our understanding of Alzheimer's disease.

Alzheimer's disease 

Alzheimer's disease (AD) patients with an inherited form of the disease may carry mutations in the presenilin proteins (PSEN1; PSEN2) or the amyloid precursor protein (APP). These disease-linked mutations result in increased production of the longer form of amyloid beta (main component of amyloid deposits found in AD brains). These mutations result in early-onset Alzheimer's Disease, which is a rare form of the disease. These rare genetic variants are autosomal dominant.

Cancer 

In addition to its role in Alzheimer's disease, presenilin-1 also found to be important in cancer. A study of broad range gene expression was conducted on human malignant melanoma. Researchers classified the malignant melanoma cell lines into two types. The study showed that presenilin-1 is down regulated in this cell type while it is overexpressed in the other cell type. Another study on multidrug resistance (MDR) cell line also reveals a role of presenilin-1 in cancer development. Because of the development to the resistance to chemicals, MDR cells become a critical factor on the success of cancer chemotherapy. In the study, researchers tried to explore the molecular mechanism by looking into the expression of Notch1 intracellular (N1IC) domain and presenilin 1. They found that there is higher level expression of both proteins and a multidrug resistance-associated protein 1 (ABCC1) was also found to be regulated by N1IC, which suggest a mechanism of ABCC1 regulated by presenilin 1 and notch signaling.

Interactions 

PSEN1 has been shown to interact with:

 BCL2,
 CTNNB1,
 CTNND1,
 FLNB,
 GFAP,
 Delta catenin,
 ICAM5,
 KCNIP3,
 NCSTN,
 PKP4, and
 UBQLN1.

References

Further reading

External links 
  GeneReviews/NCBI/NIH/UW entry on Early-Onset Familial Alzheimer Disease

Alzheimer's disease